Vrhpeč is a settlement in the Municipality of Mirna Peč in southeastern Slovenia. The area is part of the historical region of Lower Carniola. The municipality is now included in the Southeast Slovenia Statistical Region. 

The local church is built on a hill north of the settlement on which evidence of a prehistoric Iron Age hillfort has been found. It is dedicated to Saint Anne and belongs to the Parish of Trebnje. It was first mentioned in written documents dating to 1526 and was restyled in the Baroque in the 18th century.

References

External links
Vrhpeč on Geopedia

Populated places in the Municipality of Mirna Peč